The Edward D. Dupont House is a house in southeast Portland, Oregon listed on the National Register of Historic Places.

Further reading

See also
 National Register of Historic Places listings in Southeast Portland, Oregon

References

External links
 

1905 establishments in Oregon
Bungalow architecture in Oregon
Houses completed in 1905
Houses on the National Register of Historic Places in Portland, Oregon
Portland Eastside MPS
Shingle Style architecture in Oregon
Sunnyside, Portland, Oregon
Portland Historic Landmarks